Mujer de nadie (English title: A Woman of Her Own) is a Mexican telenovela that aired on Las Estrellas from 13 June 2022 to 12 August 2022. The series is produced by Giselle González for TelevisaUnivision, and is based on the 2004 telenovela Amarte es mi pecado created by Liliana Abud. It stars Livia Brito and Marcus Ornellas.

Plot 
Lucía (Livia Brito) lives in Cholula, with her father Jacobo and her stepmother Isaura, an ambitious and cruel woman. She is in love with Alfredo, but he only wants to take advantage of her innocence and purity. When Jacobo suffers a heart attack, Alfredo and Isaura seek to offer Lucía to Heriberto, the richest and most powerful man in town, who is in love with Lucía. While trying to escape from Heriberto, Lucía meets Fernando, whom she falls in love with. Lucia is evicted from her home by Heriberto's orders and has to live with her aunt Alejandra, her mother's sister, who lives with Casilda, her goddaughter. Lucía and Fernando must face several enemies that oppose their happiness.

Cast

Main 
 Livia Brito as Lucía Arizmendi
 Marcus Ornellas as Fernando Ortega
 Arap Bethke as Alfredo
 Azela Robinson as Alejandra
 Cynthia Klitbo as Isaura
 Plutarco Haza as Rafael
 María Penella as Casilda
 Juana Arias as Paulina
 Carmen Aub as Roxana
 Alexa Martín as Michelle
 Sergio Bonilla as Diego
 Ignacio Tahhan as Leonardo
 Luis Arrieta as Carlos
 Rosa María Bianchi as Gertrudis
 Verónica Langer as Martha
 Verónica Merchant as Pilar
 Adalberto Parra as Juventino
 Enrique Singer as Gabino
 Roberto Soto as Heriberto
 Ale Müller as Claudia
 Francisco Pizaña as Pedro
 Ignacio Riva Palacio as Néstor
 Clarisa González as Silvia
 Catalina López as Dominga
 Kristel Klitbo as Antonia

Guest stars 
 Marco Treviño as Jacobo

Production 
Filming of the series began on 7 March 2022, and concluded on 6 July 2022. The first teaser was shown on 16 May 2022.

Ratings 
 
}}

Episodes

References

External links 
 

2022 telenovelas
2022 Mexican television series debuts
2022 Mexican television series endings
2020s Mexican television series
Televisa telenovelas
Mexican telenovelas
Spanish-language telenovelas